Knee Lake 192B is an Indian reserve of the English River First Nation in Saskatchewan. It is 17 miles southeast of Pine River, on the Churchill River and the north shore of Knee Lake.

References

Indian reserves in Saskatchewan
Division No. 18, Saskatchewan